The Trenton Tigers were an American basketball team based in Trenton, New Jersey that was a member of the American Basketball League.

In the 1946/47 season, the team made it to the championship playoffs where they were to meet the Baltimore Bullets. Trenton was declared champion when Baltimore decided to quit the playoffs to play in the World Professional Basketball Tournament.

During the 1949/50 season, the team dropped out of the league on February 1, 1950.

Year-by-year

Defunct basketball teams in the United States
Basketball teams in New Jersey
1941 establishments in New Jersey
Sports in Trenton, New Jersey
1950 disestablishments in New Jersey
Basketball teams established in 1941
Basketball teams disestablished in 1950